The following is a list of known abandoned communities in Nunavut, Canada.

 Amadjuak
 Brooman Point Village
 Craig Harbour
 Dundas Harbour
 Fort Ross
 Iglunga
 Killiniq
 Native Point
 Port Leopold
 Qatiktalik
 Tavani
 Umingmaktok

See also
List of communities in Nunavut
Census divisions of Nunavut
Unorganized Baffin

Nunavut
Nunavut geography-related lists